Miroslava Olegovna Karpovich (born March 1, 1986) is a Russian actress, model and TV presenter. She is best known for her role as Maria Vasnetsova in Daddy's Daughters.

Roles in the theater

MAT them. Chekhov

Theatrical Agency Art-Partner XXI

Auditions

Filmography

TV

Awards and nominations

Interesting facts
 Miroslava partial to raw meat
 Miroslava hit the top of the sexiest women of Russia 2008

References

External links
 

1986 births
Russian film actresses
Russian television actresses
Russian voice actresses
Russian television presenters
Russian people of Ukrainian descent
Living people
Moscow Art Theatre School alumni
People from Berdiansk